Geroda may refer to:
 Geroda (moth), a genus of moth
 Geroda, Lower Franconia, Bavaria, Germany
 Geroda, Thuringia, Germany
 Jayrud (ancient Geroda), a city in Syria